Suzanne Joly (16 March 1914 – 2012) was a French composer and pianist born in Oran.

A child prodigy, she performed in Algeria and France before becoming the student for the piano of Lazare-Lévy and Antoinette Véluard, for writing of Olivier Messiaen and Jean Roger-Ducasse at the Conservatoire de Paris. Her real name was 'Suzanne Obadia', wife of painter Louis Joly, she wrote a musical work covering all genres: Petite Suite for orchestra (1942) Sérénade; Fantaisie concertante for piano and orchestra (1944–1948) Rupestre pour orchestre (1968) Mélodies (Paul Verlaine, Andrée Brunin,...); Ode à la Jeune Fille (1968); String quartet; Thème, Variations et Allegro Fugato for solo piano (1956) etc.

Died in Paris in 2012, she was buried at Cimetière parisien de Bagneux.

A large part of her archives is housed at the Centre International Albert Roussel.

References

External links 

Conservatoire de Paris alumni
Academic staff of the Schola Cantorum de Paris
20th-century French women classical pianists
French women composers
1914 births
2012 deaths
People from Oran
Women music educators
Pieds-Noirs
Migrants from French Algeria to France